Ioannis Skarafingas (born 2 March 1935) is a Greek former sports shooter. He competed at the 1968, 1972 and the 1976 Summer Olympics.

References

1935 births
Living people
Greek male sport shooters
Olympic shooters of Greece
Shooters at the 1968 Summer Olympics
Shooters at the 1972 Summer Olympics
Shooters at the 1976 Summer Olympics
Sportspeople from Central Greece
People from Spercheiada
20th-century Greek people